The Central District of Famenin County is a district (bakhsh) in Famenin County, Hamadan Province, Iran. At the 2006 census, its population was 36,214, in 8,787 families.  The District has one city: Famenin. The District has two rural districts (dehestan): Khorram Dasht Rural District and Mofatteh Rural District.

References 

Famenin County
Districts of Hamadan Province